Events from the year 1878 in art.

Events
 November 25–26 – James McNeill Whistler's libel case against English art critic John Ruskin over a scathing 1877 review of Whistler's painting Nocturne in Black and Gold – The Falling Rocket is heard in the High Court of Justice in London. Whistler wins a farthing in nominal damages and only half of the costs, leading to his bankruptcy, and alienates patrons.
 French critic Théodore Duret publishes the pamphlet Les Peintres impressionistes.
 Czech painter Karel Klíč perfects the photogravure process.

Works

 Ivan Aivazovsky – Sea View by Moonlight
 Jules Bastien-Lepage
 Les Enfants Pecheurs ("The child fishers")
 Les Foins ("Haymaking")
 Reinhold Begas – Mercury and Psyche (marble, Berlin, Germany)
 Emmanuel Benner – Lakeside Dwelling 
 Gustave Caillebotte
 Bather about to dive
 The Canoes (Museum of Fine Arts of Rennes)
 Fisherman on the bank of the Yerres
 The Orange Trees
 Rue Halévy: view from the sixth floor
 View of rooftops, effect of snow
 Mary Cassatt – Portrait of the Artist
 Eduard Charlemont – The Moorish Chief
 William Merritt Chase
 A Fishmarket in Venice
 The Mandolin Player
 Stanisław Chlebowski – Sultan Bayezid prisoned by Timur
 James Collinson – The Holy Family
 Evelyn De Morgan – Night and Sleep
 Maurycy Gottlieb – Jews Praying in the Synagogue on Yom Kippur
 Jean-Jacques Henner
 The Magdalene
 Portrait of M. Hayem
 Ivan Kramskoi – Portrait of the Artist Alexander Litovchenko
 Robert Walker Macbeth – Sedge Cutting in Wicken Fen, Cambridgeshire, early morning
 Édouard Manet
 At the Café
 Blonde Woman with Bare Breasts (Musée d'Orsay, Paris)
 The Plum
 The Rue Mosnier with Flags
 Jan Matejko – Battle of Grunwald
 John Everett Millais
 A Jersey Lily
 The Two Princes Edward and Richard in the Tower, 1483
 Pierre-Auguste Renoir – Madame Georges Charpentier and her children
 Ilya Repin – Self-portrait
 Briton Rivière – Persepolis
 Auguste Rodin – The Walking Man (bronze)
 Félicien Rops – Pornocrates
 Dante Gabriel Rossetti
 The Blessed Damozel (probable completion date)
 A Vision of Fiammetta
 Alfred Sisley – Snow at Louveciennes (Musée d'Orsay, Paris)
 James Tissot
 Kathleen Newton In An Armchair
 Seaside
 Viktor Vasnetsov – The Knight at the Crossroads
 Hubert von Herkomer – Eventide: A Scene in the Westminster Union
 William Frederick Yeames – And When Did You Last See Your Father? (Walker Art Gallery, Liverpool)

Births
 4 January – Augustus John, Welsh painter (died 1961)
 16 January – Karl Isakson, Swedish painter (died 1922)
 14 February – Bohumil Kafka, Bohemian Czech sculptor (died 1942)
 27 February – Max Silberberg, German Jewish industrialist and art collector (killed after 1942)
 12 March – Gerda Höglund, Swedish religious painter (died 1973)
 27 March – Kathleen Bruce (later Lady Scott), English sculptor (died 1947)
 28 March – Abraham Walkowitz, American Modernist painter (died 1965)
 1 April – Alfred Flechtheim, German art dealer, collector and publisher (died 1937)
 2 April – Émilie Charmy, French artist (died 1974)
 24 April – Jean Crotti, French painter (died 1958)
 26 May – Spencer Gore, English painter (died 1914)
 9 August – Eileen Gray, Irish furniture designer and architect (died 1976)
 7 October – Feliu Elias, Spanish caricaturist and painter (died 1948)
 8 October – Alfred Munnings, English equine painter (died 1959)
 14 November – Julie Manet, French painter and art collector (died 1966)
 23 November – Frank Pick, English transport administrator and patron of art and design (died 1941)
 24 November – Norman Wilkinson, English marine artist (died 1971)
 27 November – William Orpen, Irish portrait painter (died 1931)

Deaths
 January 26 – Théophile Schuler, French painter and illustrator (born  1821)
 February – Tito Angelini, Italian sculptor (born 1806)
February 9 – Nicolas Gosse, French historical painter (born 1787)
 February 19
 George Paul Chalmers, Scottish painter (born 1833; died as the result of a street attack)
 Charles-François Daubigny, French painter (born 1817)
 February 26 – Alexandre Antigna, French painter (born 1817)
 March 3 – Joseph Bonomi the Younger, English sculptor, artist, Egyptologist and museum curator (born 1796)
 April 14 – Ludovic Piette, French impressionist painter (born 1826)
 April 23 – Jaroslav Čermák, Czech historical painter (born 1831)
 May 25 – Antoine Laurent Dantan, French academic sculptor (born 1798)
 June 10 – Tranquillo Cremona, Italian painter (born 1837)
 June 16 – Kikuchi Yōsai, Japanese painter most famous for his monochrome portraits of historical figures (born 1781)
 August 21 – Conrad Martens, English-born landscape painter (born 1801)
 October 5 – Francis Grant, Scottish painter (born 1803)
 November 11 – Robert Havell, Jr., English principal engraver of Audubon's The Birds of America (born 1793)
 November 16 – Đura Jakšić, Serbian painter and poet (born 1832)
 December 19 – Joseph Nash, English watercolour painter and lithographer (born 1809)
 date unknown – Amédée Faure, French portrait painter (born 1801)

 
Years of the 19th century in art
1870s in art